Robin V. Sears is a communications, marketing, and public affairs adviser with experience on three continents for public- and private-sector clients.  Sears joined the Earnscliffe Strategy Group in 2012 and was an NDP strategist for 20 years.

Bibliography 
Sears began his career as News Editor under Moses Znaimer at the launch of CITY-TV in Toronto in 1972. He attended Trent University, but dropped out to pursue his political career before graduation. He is married to Robin Harris and father to one son, Matthew. His father Val Sears was an editor of the Toronto Star. Colin Cameron, his maternal grandfather, was a founder of the Co-operative Commonwealth Federation party. 

Sears served as paid spokesman for former Prime Minister Brian Mulroney.

Sears had been a consultant at Navigator and Ensight Ltd. since 2004. As a lobbyist, Sears has worked on Merger and acquisition transactions in transportation, finance, and resources, and on reputation management projects in healthcare, retail, and in the film and television industries.

References 

Year of birth missing (living people)
Canadian businesspeople
Living people